UCSF Parnassus station is a pair of light rail stops on the Muni Metro N Judah line, located in the Inner Sunset neighborhood of San Francisco, California. The stops are located at Irving and 2nd Avenue in the westbound direction and Irving and Arguello in the eastbound direction. They opened with the N Judah line on October 21, 1928. They are the primary stop for the Parnassus campus of the University of California, San Francisco.

The inbound stop has a long bulb-out serving as the platform, with a shelter and handicapped-accessible mini-high platform at the eastern end. The outbound stop has a shelter east of 2nd Avenue (but no bulb-out); the mini-high platform is located west of 2nd Avenue.

References

External links

SFMTA - Irving St & Arguello Blvd, Irving St & 2nd Ave
SF Bay Transit (unofficial) - Irving St & Arguello Blvd, Irving St & 2nd Ave

Muni Metro stations
Sunset District, San Francisco
Railway stations in California at university and college campuses
Railway stations in the United States opened in 1928